Data collection or data gathering is the process of gathering and measuring information on targeted variables in an established system, which then enables one to answer relevant questions and evaluate outcomes. Data collection is a research component in all study fields, including physical and social sciences, humanities, and business. While methods vary by discipline, the emphasis on ensuring accurate and honest collection remains the same. The goal for all data collection is to capture quality evidence that allows analysis to lead to the formulation of convincing and credible answers to the questions that have been posed. Data collection and validation consists of four steps when it involves taking a census and seven steps when it involves sampling.

Regardless of the field of or preference for defining data (quantitative or qualitative), accurate data collection is essential to maintain research integrity. The selection of appropriate data collection instruments (existing, modified, or newly developed) and delineated instructions for their correct use reduce the likelihood of errors.

A formal data collection process is necessary as it ensures that the data gathered are both defined and accurate. This way, subsequent decisions based on arguments embodied in the findings are made using valid data. The process provides both a baseline from which to measure and in certain cases an indication of what to improve.

There are 5 common data collection methods:
closed-ended surveys and quizzes,
open-ended surveys and questionnaires,
1-on-1 interviews,
focus groups, and
direct observation.

Data management platform 

Data management platform (DMP) is a centralized storage and analytical system for data. Mainly used by marketers, DMPs exist to compile and transform large amounts of data into discernible information. Marketers may want to receive and utilize first, second and third-party data. 

With the announcement of the demise of third-party cookies in recent years, marketers have recognised the importance of collecting first-party data.

First-party data is defined as the data that is directly collected by businesses from their audience, customers and prospects. A simple form with opt-ins allows you to collect and process their data. This data is only available to the owners of the website visited by the user.

DMPs enable this, because they are the aggregate system of DSPs (demand side platform) and SSPs (supply side platform). When it comes to advertising, DMPs are integral for optimizing and guiding marketers in future campaigns. This system and their effectiveness is proof that categorized, analyzed, and compiled data is far more useful than raw data.

Data integrity issues 
The main reason for maintaining data integrity is to support the observation of errors in the data collection process. Those errors may be made intentionally (deliberate falsification) or non-intentionally (random or systematic errors).

There are two approaches that may protect data integrity and secure scientific validity of study results invented by Craddick, Crawford, Rhodes, Redican, Rukenbrod and Laws in 2003:
 Quality assurance – all actions carried out before data collection
 Quality control – all actions carried out during and after data collection

Quality assurance 

Its main focus is prevention which is primarily a cost-effective activity to protect the integrity of data collection. Standardization of protocol best demonstrates this cost-effective activity, which is developed in a comprehensive and detailed procedures manual for data collection. The risk of failing to identify problems and errors in the research process is evidently caused by poorly written guidelines. Listed are several examples of such failures:

 Uncertainty of timing, methods and identification of the responsible person
 Partial listing of items needed to be collected
 Vague description of data collection instruments instead of rigorous step-by-step instructions on administering tests
 Failure to recognize exact content and strategies for training and retraining staff members responsible for data collection
 Unclear instructions for using, making adjustments to, and calibrating data collection equipment
 No predetermined mechanism to document changes in procedures that occur during the investigation

Quality control 

Since quality control actions occur during or after the data collection all the details are carefully documented. There is a necessity for a clearly defined communication structure as a precondition for establishing monitoring systems. Uncertainty about the flow of information is not recommended as a poorly organized communication structure leads to lax monitoring and can also limit the opportunities for detecting errors. Quality control is also responsible for the identification of actions necessary for correcting faulty data collection practices and also minimizing such future occurrences. A team is more likely to not realize the necessity to perform these actions if their procedures are written vaguely and are not based on feedback or education.

Data collection problems that necessitate prompt action:

 Systematic errors
 Violation of protocol 
 Fraud or scientific misconduct
 Errors in individual data items
 Individual staff or site performance problems
 Shadow Effect (Genetics)

See also

References

External links 

All about data collection – TechTarget.com

 
Survey methodology
Design of experiments